Joseph Chan may refer to:

 Joseph Chan Ho-lim (born 1977), Hong Kong politician
 Joseph Chan Yuek-sut (born 1936), Hong Kong politician
 Joseph Chan (sport shooter) (born 1946), Papua New Guinean sports shooter

See also 
 Joey Chan (born 1988), Hong Kong squash player